Ahmadabad (also Romanized as Aḩmadābād; also known as Deh-e ‘Īsā Khān) is a village in Mahvelat-e Shomali Rural District, Shadmehr District, Mahvelat County, Razavi Khorasan Province, Iran. At the 2006 census, its population was 1,165, in 256 families.

See also 

 List of cities, towns and villages in Razavi Khorasan Province

References 

Populated places in Mahvelat County